Seoul Metro 1000 series (VVVF)
 Seoul Metro 1000 series (Rheostat Control)